The women's discus throw competition at the 2004 Summer Olympics in Athens was held at the Olympic Stadium on 20–21 August. It was originally planned to hold the discus throw at the Ancient Olympia Stadium, but it was discovered that the field was not large enough to accommodate the range of modern discus throwers, and would have posed a danger to spectators. As such, it was decided to move the discus throw and to hold the shot put at the ancient stadium, despite the fact that the shot put was not contested at the Ancient Olympic Games.

On December 5, 2012, Belarusian discus thrower Iryna Yatchenko was stripped of her bronze medal after drug re-testings of her samples on methandienone had been discovered positive. Following the announcement of Yatchenko's disqualification, the International Olympic Committee Executive Board had distributed and awarded the bronze to Czech Republic's Věra Pospíšilová-Cechlová, who originally finished fourth in the final.

Competition format
Each athlete receives three throws in the qualifying round. All who achieve the qualifying distance progress to the final. If less than twelve athletes achieve this mark, then the twelve furthest throwing athletes reach the final. Each finalist is allowed three throws in last round, with the top eight athletes after that point being given three further attempts.

Schedule
All times are Greece Standard Time (UTC+2)

Records
, the existing World and Olympic records were as follows.

No new records were set during the competition.

Results

Qualifying round
Rule: Qualifying standard 62.50 (Q) or at least best 12 qualified (q).

Final

References

External links
Official Olympic Report

W
Discus throw at the Olympics
2004 in women's athletics
Women's events at the 2004 Summer Olympics